White Congolese are the people from the Democratic Republic of the Congo who are of European descent and  are not part of another racial group.

History 

The white population in the Congo is tied to the creation of the Belgian colonial empire and fluctuated during and after Belgian rule. During the existence of the Congo Free State, the European population was estimated at 1500 people. Following annexation and the formation of the Belgian Congo, that number grew to 17,000 in 1930 but plummeted to 11,000 in 1934. In 1947, the white population was 24,000 and 115,157 in 1959. The post-World War II white population increased steadily until 1960, when Belgium granted the Republic of the Congo its independence.

White settlers were primarily government officials and missionaries, and disproportionately young men. Belgians made up between 40 and 65 percent of the white population until after World War II. During the existence of the Congo Free State and the early years of the Belgian Congo, the majority of White Congolese were Scandinavian. Demographics shifted throughout the 1950s. By 1959, 0.9 percent of the total Belgian population lived in the Congo.

Because of the Congo's large land area and population, White Congolese made up only about 0.8 percent of the total population in 1959. Belgian officials discouraged large scale immigration of white settlers to set up small businesses until the final 15 years of the colony's existence.

The White Congolese population contracted after the end of colonization and the Congo Crisis but smaller numbers remained in Zaire and later the Democratic Republic of Congo. White Congolese settlers participated in and supported the secession of the State of Katanga.

White Congolese Belgian nuns were at the center of the 1976 Ebola outbreak at a clinic in Yambuku, with several white health workers becoming fatally ill with the virus.

5,000 people from Belgium and 5,000 people from Greece currently live in DR Congo.

Notable people 

Marie Branser (born 1992), German-born naturalized Congolese judoka, 2020 Olympian

See also
Greeks in the Democratic Republic of the Congo
History of the Jews in the Democratic Republic of the Congo
White people
White Angolans
White Zambians

References

Further reading

"Democratic Republic of Congo Country Profile." Genocide Watch, 1 December 2012.

 
White culture in Africa